MRSL may refer to:

Minnesota Recreational Soccer League, an adult soccer association, part of the Minnesota Amateur Soccer League
Salama Airport, in Costa Rica by ICAO code